The Pinedale Ranger Station is in the Apache-Sitgreaves National Forests, and located near Pinedale in Navajo County, Arizona.

History
The ranger station's buildings were built in 1934 by the CCC − Civilian Conservation Corps.

The administration of timber sales was one of the ranger's main duties; the lumber mill town of Standard is located about three miles to the south.

It was listed on the National Register of Historic Places for its architecture, which is American Craftsman and Bungalow style.  It was designed by architects of the USDA Forest Service.

See also
 National Register of Historic Places listings in Navajo County, Arizona
 CCC – Civilian Conservation Corps projects in Arizona

References

Apache-Sitgreaves National Forests
United States Forest Service ranger stations
Buildings and structures in Navajo County, Arizona
Government buildings completed in 1934
National Register of Historic Places in Navajo County, Arizona
Park buildings and structures on the National Register of Historic Places in Arizona
Civilian Conservation Corps in Arizona
American Craftsman architecture in Arizona
Bungalow architecture in Arizona
1934 establishments in Arizona